Bonestan (also Romanized as Bonestān and Benestān; also known as Banā Bostān) is a village in Saghder Rural District, Jebalbarez District, Jiroft County, Kerman Province, Iran. At the 2006 census, its population was 235, in 71 families.

References 

Populated places in Jiroft County